Francisco De Vaca is a Mexican-American professional boxer.

De Vaca lost to Emanuel Navarrete for the WBO super bantamweight world title on August 17, 2019 by 3rd round technical knockout.  

The bout was to be on the undercard to Jose Benavidez vs. Luis Collazo.  However, the bout ended up headlining the first ever boxing event at Banc of California Stadium.  

Upon the bout being made, De Vaca was ranked No. 11 by the WBO.  By the night of the fight, he was ranked tenth by the WBO and was a 35-1 underdog.

References

External links

1995 births
Living people
American people of Mexican descent
American male boxers
Super-bantamweight boxers